Appu is a 2002 Indian Kannada-language romantic action comedy film directed by Puri Jagannadh. It stars Puneeth Rajkumar and Rakshita. The supporting cast features Avinash, Srinivasa Murthy and Sumithra. The film was produced by Puneeth's mother, Parvathamma under Poornima Enterprises, the production banner of the Rajkumar family. It marked the screen debut Puneeth and Rakshita in lead roles.

Up on theatrical release on 26 April 2002, the film was a success and completed a 200-day run in theatres. The lead actor Puneeth Rajkumar came to be known as "Appu" hereafter among the masses, colloquially.

The film was remade in Telugu in 2002 as Idiot (Directed by Puri Jagannadh), in Tamil in 2003 as Dum, in Bengali in 2006 as Hero and in Bangladeshi Bengali in 2008 as Priya Amar Priya.

Plot  
Appu is a carefree guy, who spends time hanging with his friends, and is also the son of a head constable named Venkata Swamy. One night, Appu is thrashed by a rival gang at night, but was rescued by a girl named Suchitra. She pays his hospital bills and donates her blood. She is gone from the hospital by the time Appu regains consciousness. When Appu's friends inform him about the girl who rescued him, he starts to fall for her for her kindheartedness, though he did not see her. Suchi later turns out to be the daughter of the city commissioner Rajshekhar.

Appu meets Suchi in the college and expresses his love. When she does not agree, he teases her which leads to Suchi to complain about Appu to Rajshekhar, who takes Appu to the police station and severely beats him before being rescued by Venkatswamy and his superior SI Sudarshan. Even though Appu is beaten by Rajshekhar, he becomes more adamant to win over Suchi, and proposes to Suchi again in the college, where she asks him to jump from the building. When Appu is ready to do so, Suchi agrees to his love. However, Rajshekhar is not happy about their relationship and hires some goons to amputate Appu.

Suchi discovers this and runs to help him, but is met with an accident. Both of them get admitted to the same hospital where they unite there also. Rajshekhar arranges her marriage with another person, to which she openly opposes and tries to commit suicide. Appu arrives and rescues her, but Rajshekhar still wants to get her married to a man of his own choice, where he also engages goons to kill Appu. Appu finally escapes all the troubles and meets the DGP to help him to marry his love. The DGP finally suspends Rajshekhar and arranges Appu's marriage in the police station. Finally, Appu appears for civil services and is selected for IPS.

Cast

Production
After the success of Yuvaraja (2001), Puri Jagannadh was approached by the Rajkumar family to introduce their third son Puneeth Rajkumar to make his onscreen debut as the lead actor. Puri gladly accepted the opportunity. Rakshitha, daughter of cameraman B.C. Gowrishankar made her acting debut with this film, and she went on to play the same character in its Telugu and Tamil remakes.

Soundtrack

Gurukiran composed the film's background score and music for its soundtrack, with the lyrics written by Upendra, Sriranga and Hamsalekha. The soundtrack album consists of six tracks.

References

External links 
 
Rediff article

2000s Kannada-language films
2002 films
Indian romantic action films
Kannada films remade in other languages
Films scored by Gurukiran
Films directed by Puri Jagannadh
2002 action comedy films
2002 romantic comedy films
Indian action comedy films
Indian romantic comedy films
Films shot in Bangalore
Films shot in Switzerland
2000s masala films
Films set in universities and colleges
2000s romantic action films